Fernand Jean-Baptiste Dubief (14 October 1850 – 4 June 1916) was a French doctor and Radical politician who was Minister of Commerce, Industry and PTT in 1905 and then Minister of the Interior in 1905–06.

Early years

Fernand Jean-Baptiste Dubief was born on 14 October 1850 in Varennes-lès-Mâcon, Saône-et-Loire.
His father was a Republican and was deported after the 2 December 1851 coup by Napoleon III.
Dubief received his secondary education in Mâcon.
During the Franco-Prussian War of 1870 he served in the Armée de la Loire.
He obtained a diploma as a doctor in 1875. 
Dubief was medical director of the lunatic asylum of Saint-Pierre in Marseille from 1886 to 1893, and later was superintendent of the Rhone asylum in Lyon.
He became a Freemason, and sat on the Council of the Grand Orient, the central Freemasonry authority in France.

Political career

In 1893 Dubief was elected mayor of Romanèche-Thorins and was also elected to the Saône-et-Loire departmental general council.
In the general elections of 20 August 1893 he was elected in the first round as deputy for the first district of Mâcon.
He sat with the Radical Republican and Radical Socialist group.
Dubief supported strong measures against strikers.
When a private bill was introduced in 1897 to grant amnesty to arrested strikers, Dubief wrote that the bill "would have no other result than to undermine the workings of justice, to the great damage of respect for the laws."
Dubief was reelected in the general election of 8 May 1898.
He was secretary of the assembly from 1898 to 1900.
On 27 April 1902 he was reelected in a landslide.

In 1905 Dubief was chairman of the Radical Socialist group, president of the Commission du Travail, and regarded as an expert of labor issues.
Under Maurice Rouvier he was Minister of Commerce, Industry, Posts and Telegraphs from 24 January 1905 to 12 November 1905.
On 13 July 1905 Dubief presented a bill requiring ongoing vocational education in the workplace for young workers.
This bill was eventually passed in 1919 under the name of Placide Astier.
Dubief was responsible for a law that was approved on 8 October 1905 which established a special tariff of medical fees for accidents to working men.

After a cabinet reshuffle Dubief was Minister of the Interior from 12 November 1905 to 14 March 1906 under Rouvier and then Armand Fallières.
During his ministry the separation of the church and state was adopted in December 1905 despite the strong opposition of Pope Pius X.
He was succeeded as Minister of the Interior by Georges Clemenceau, the prime minister for the next three years.
In 1906 Dubief was elected mayor of the commune of Prissé.

Dubief tried to make the point that the mentally ill were suffering from a disease, and should therefore be helped and protected by the state. 
Some of his statements reflected the poor state of understanding of the time.
Thus he said in 1907 that epileptics should be isolated because people who were vulnerable to the disease might be infected by their cries.
However, he also thought that an epileptic might not be mentally ill.
Dubief lost his seat as deputy in the general elections of 1910 to a Radical Socialist opponent, but was reelected in the first round on 26 April 1914.
Ferdand Dubief died at the age of 65 on 4 June 1916 in  Asnières-sur-Seine, Seine.

Publications

Notes

Sources

1850 births
1916 deaths
People from Saône-et-Loire
Politicians from Bourgogne-Franche-Comté
Radical Party (France) politicians
French Ministers of Commerce
French interior ministers
Members of the 6th Chamber of Deputies of the French Third Republic
Members of the 7th Chamber of Deputies of the French Third Republic
Members of the 8th Chamber of Deputies of the French Third Republic
Members of the 9th Chamber of Deputies of the French Third Republic
Members of the 11th Chamber of Deputies of the French Third Republic